Juan Ponce de León II (1524–1591) was a Spanish official and an acting governor of Puerto Rico. He was the first acting governor to be born on the island.

Early years
Ponce de León II (birth name: Juan Troche Ponce de León), was born in San Juan, Puerto Rico, Viceroyalty of New Spain, to Juan García "Gracia" Troche and Juana Ponce de León. The Spanish conquistador Juan Ponce de León was Ponce de León II's maternal grandfather.

Settlement in Trinidad
Ponce de León II was sent by the Spanish Crown to establish a settlement on the island of Trinidad in 1569.  He founded the "town of the Circumcision", probably around modern Laventille. In 1570, this settlement was abandoned, possibly because of the raids by the Caribs, which resulted in the death of Ponce de Leon's son. According to some historians, Ponce de León II may have been an on-and-off governor of the island from 1571 to 1591.

The first Puerto Rican acting governor of Puerto Rico
In 1579, the Spanish Crown named Jerónimo De Agüero Campuzano governor of Puerto Rico. He was to replace the then governor Francisco De Obando Y Mexia. During the time that it took Jerónimo De Agüero Campuzano to travel from Spain to Puerto Rico, Ponce de León II was appointed acting governor. He thus became the first native-born Puerto Rican to be appointed Spanish governor of Puerto Rico.

Written work "Melgarejo's Memoirs"
In 1581, at the request of King Philip II of Spain, Juan Lopez Melgarejo, who served as governor of Puerto Rico from 1581 to 1582, asked Juan Ponce de León II to write a general description of the West Indies with emphasis on the part corresponding to Puerto Rico. He did this with the collaboration of his fellow Puerto Rican Antonio de Santa Clara. Ponce de León II's written work Memorias de Melgarejo (Melgarejo's Memoirs) is one of Puerto Rico's most important historical documents. In 1581, Ponce de León II was able to establish the exact geographical coordinates of San Juan by observing an eclipse.

Later years

Later in life, after he became a widower, Ponce de León II embraced and lived a religious life. He took it upon himself to transfer the body of his grandfather, Juan Ponce de León, to San José Church in San Juan from Cuba, where he had died and been buried in 1521 after being wounded in an attempt to colonize Florida. His grandfather's remains were moved once again in 1913, when they were transferred to the Cathedral of San Juan Bautista, which is also located in Old San Juan.

Juan Ponce de León II's remains are still interred at San José Church in San Juan. Puerto Rico has honored his memory by naming a high school in the town of Florida, Puerto Rico after him.

Ancestors

Notes

See also

 Juan Ponce de León
 List of Puerto Ricans
 List of governors of Puerto Rico

References

External links
Spanish Governors of Trinidad
Puerto Rico Profile: Ponce de León

1524 births
1591 deaths
People from San Juan, Puerto Rico
Royal Governors of Puerto Rico
Governors of Puerto Rico
Puerto Rican writers
Puerto Rican scientists
Spanish West Indies
Governors of Trinidad and Tobago
Spanish period of Trinidad and Tobago